A run-off transcription assay is an assay in molecular biology which is conducted in vitro to identify the position of the transcription start site (1 base pair upstream) of a specific promoter along with its accuracy and rate of in vitro transcription.

Run-off transcription can be used to quantitatively measure the effect of changing promoter regions on in vitro transcription levels, Because of its in vitro nature, however, this assay cannot accurately predict cell-specific gene transcription rates, unlike in vivo assays such as nuclear run-on.

To perform a run-off transcription assay, a gene of interest, including the promoter, is cloned into a plasmid. The plasmid is digested at a known restriction enzyme cut site downstream from the transcription start site such that the expected mRNA run-off product would be easily separated by gel electrophoresis.
DNA needs to be highly purified prior to running this assay. 
 To initiate transcription, radiolabeled UTP, the other nucleotides, and RNA polymerase are added to the linearized DNA. Transcription continues until the RNA polymerase reaches the end of the DNA where it simply “runs off” the DNA template, resulting in an mRNA fragment of a defined length. This fragment can then be separated by gel electrophoresis, alongside size standards, and autoradiographed. The corresponding size of the band will represent the size of the mRNA from the restriction enzyme cut site to the transcription start site (+1). The intensity of the band will indicate the amount of mRNA produced.

Additionally, it can be used to detect whether or not transcription is carried out under certain conditions (i.e. in the presence of different chemicals).

References

Molecular biology techniques